Safari Motorcoach Corporation (also known as Safari Coach) is a defunct American motor coach manufacturing company that was based in Oregon. The company's manufacturing plant was initially located in Harrisburg. The Safari Coach brand name was purchased by Monaco in 2002, however the Safari Coach name was no longer being used as of 2009.

History

Safari was founded in the 1980s by Mat Perlot and Curt Lawler, former employees of Beaver Motorcoach Corporation. The company started building diesel- and gas-powered Class A motorhomes. Safari bought Beaver in 1994 for $7.6 million after outbidding Country Coach. In 2002, Monaco Coach purchased Safari and Beaver brand names. In 2006 Beaver moved its  assembly plant.  Safari was able to keep its plant in Harrisburg open. Safari also shared ownership in Beaver's Bend assembly plant. In 2006 the Beaver plant moved and Safari had to vacate.  Throughout his career, Mat Perlot stayed in touch with his customer base. He knew that once you owned one of his coaches, you were a candidate for another, newer one down the road.  One of the ways he did this was to create Safari International, a chapter of the Family Motor Coach Association.  With over 4,000 members at one time Mat knew what they wanted in a motor coach and he was excited to market to their desires.  Today, Safari International still exists, albeit much smaller in size, but they still maintain their beautiful coaches with pride.  They can be found at Safari-International.org

Bankruptcy And Closure Of Brand

In 2009, Monaco filed for Chapter 11 bankruptcy. The following year Navistar International purchased Monaco, but Navistar did not purchase the Safari Coach brand name, the Safari and Beaver brand names were no longer used.

References

1986 establishments in Oregon
2009 disestablishments in Oregon
Manufacturing companies based in Oregon
Companies that filed for Chapter 11 bankruptcy in 2009
Defunct companies based in Oregon
Recreational vehicle manufacturers